The Cambridge Centre for Alternative Finance is a research institute established in 2015 as a part of Cambridge Judge Business School, University of Cambridge, United Kingdom. The centre's research focuses on financial channels and instruments that emerge outside traditional financial ecosystems.

The current academic director of the Cambridge Centre for Alternative Finance is Raghavendra Rau who is the first holder of the Sir Evelyn de Rothschild Professorship of Finance at Judge Business School. Notable members and fellows of the centre include Bob Wigley, the chairman of UK Finance and former UK business ambassador to the prime minister, as well as David De Cremer.

The centre's agenda is aimed at informing research, governments, industry, and policymakers about alternative finance instruments and channels as well as underlying technologies. Since its inception, the centre's main research activity has constituted benchmarking the growth of alternative finance across different geographies and sectors via annual reports for major regions and countries. Another principal research field encompasses alternative payment systems, including benchmarking studies on blockchain and cryptocurrencies as well as DLT and cryptoasset regulation. The centre has also published research on regulatory innovation as well as regulatory implications of the emergence of FinTech firms. Several of these reports have been jointly published with other universities and research institutes, including University of Chicago Booth School of Business, Tsinghua University, University of California, Berkeley, Zhejiang University, University of Western Ontario, and the University of Agder. In addition, the centre hosts an annual alternative finance conference at the University of Cambridge.

The centre's publications have been cited in numerous regulatory and policy papers by international organisations and government bodies, some of which include the World Bank, the Organisation for Economic Co-operation and Development, the United Nations Economic and Social Commission for Asia and the Pacific, the International Organization of Securities Commissions, the Association of Southeast Asian Nations, and the UK Parliament.

References

External links 
 Regulatory Impact
 Cambridge Centre for Alternative Finance on Twitter
 Cambridge Finance

Business education
Educational institutions established in 2015
Alternative Finance
2015 establishments in England